Scythris pelochyta is a moth of the family Scythrididae. It was described by Edward Meyrick in 1909. It is found in the South African provinces of Gauteng and Mpumalanga.

The wingspan is about 12 mm. The forewings are whitish ochreous and the hindwings are grey.

References

Endemic moths of South Africa
pelochyta
Moths described in 1909